Alan Leonard Broadbent  (born 23 April 1947) is a New Zealand jazz pianist, arranger, and composer known for his work with artists such as Sue Raney, Charlie Haden, Woody Herman, Chet Baker, Irene Kral, Sheila Jordan, Natalie Cole, Warne Marsh, Bud Shank, and many others.

Early life
Born in Auckland in 1947, Broadbent studied piano and music theory in his own country, but in 1966 went to the United States to study at the Berklee College of Music.

Later life and career
During the 1990s, Broadbent recorded on Natalie Cole's album Unforgettable... with Love, then became her pianist and conductor for the tour. His arrangement for her video "When I Fall in Love" won the Grammy Award for Best Orchestral Arrangement Accompanying a Vocal. During the 1980s and 1990s, he recorded with Charlie Haden's Quartet West. Around this time he won a Grammy Award for his arrangement of Leonard Bernstein's "Lonely Town" that was recorded by Shirley Horn. He wrote arrangements for Glenn Frey's album After Hours and for Paul McCartney's album Kisses on the Bottom. He has worked as conductor for Diana Krall.

In the 2008 Queen's Birthday Honours, Broadbent was appointed a Member of the New Zealand Order of Merit, for services to jazz.

In the November 2013 issue of Down Beat magazine, his solo piano album Heart to Heart received a five-star rating.

Discography

As leader/co-leader

As sideman or arranger
With Natalie Cole
 Unforgettable... with Love (1991)
 Take a Look (1993)
 Holly and Ivy (1994)
 Stardust (1996)
 Ask a Woman Who Knows (2002)
 Still Unforgettable (2008)

With Michael Feinstein
 Isn't It Romantic (1988)
 The M.G.M. Album (1989)
 Such Sweet Sorrow (1995)

With Charlie Haden
 Quartet West (Verve, 1987)
 The Private Collection (Naim, 1987–88 [2000])
 In Angel City (Verve, 1988)
 Haunted Heart (Verve, 1991)
 Always Say Goodbye (Verve, 1993)
 Now Is the Hour (Verve, 1995)
 The Art of the Song (Verve, 1999)
 American Dreams (Verve, 2002)
 Sophisticated Ladies (EmArcy, 2010)

With Scott Hamilton
 1993 Scott Hamilton with Strings
 1997 Christmas Love Song
 1997 Late Night Christmas Eve

With Woody Herman
 1961 Hits of Woody Herman
 1971 Brand New
 1971 Woody
 1973 Giant Steps
 1974 Thundering Herd
 1975 Children of Lima
 1975 Herd at Montreux
 1979 Woody and Friends at the Monterey Jazz Festival

With Irene Kral
 Where Is Love? (Choice, 1974)
 Kral Space (Catalyst, 1977)
 Gentle Rain (Choice, 1978)

With others
 1976 Summer Place '76, Percy Faith
 1977 First Flight, Don Menza
 1978 Shortcake, Bill Berry
 1978 Wallflower, Don Rader
 1979 Wet, Barbra Streisand
 1980 Crystal Comments, Bud Shank
 1980 Double Jazz Quartet at Carmelo's Vols. 1 & 2, Shelly Manne
 1980 Playin' It Straight, Jack Sheldon
 1982 Warne Marsh Meets Gary Foster, Warne Marsh
 1986 Oslo, Bob Brookmeyer
 1986 Satin Nights, Charlie Shoemake
 1987 Serious Swingers, Bud Shank
 1990 In Good Company, Sue Raney
 1990 Stolen Moments, Lee Ritenour
 1991 The Forest, David Byrne
 1992 Follow the Bouncing Ball, Charles McPherson
 1992 Here's to Life, Shirley Horn
 1992 Wes Bound, Lee Ritenour
 1993 Heart Strings, Sheila Jordan
 1994 East Coast West Coast, Toots Thielemans
 1994 Professional Dreamer, Kenny Rankin
 1994 Sweet Home Cookin', Karrin Allyson
 1995 The Five Seasons, Eddie Daniels
 1997 Silent Pool, Marian McPartland
 1998 This Christmas, Ann Hampton Callaway
 1999 Music Is My Life, Diane Schuur
 1999 Why Should I Care, Diana Krall
 2000 From the Heart, Sheila Jordan
 2000 More Live-Lee, Lee Konitz
 2002 In the Sun, Jane Monheit
 2003 Live at the Rainbow Room, Jane Monheit
 2004 Hummin' to Myself, Linda Ronstadt
 2004 Reneé Olstead, Renee Olstead
 2005 The Great American Songbook, Rod Stewart
 2005 The Songs of Sinatra, Steve Tyrell
 2009 Legendary, Bob Florence
 2010 You Are There: Duets, Hilary Kole
 2011 Music Is Better Than Words, Seth MacFarlane
 2016 The Art of Elegance, Kristin Chenoweth
 2017 Turn Up the Quiet, Diana Krall
 2020 From This Place, Pat Metheny
 2020 This Dream of You, Diana Krall

See also 
 List of music arrangers

References

External links
New England Jazz History Database - Audio Interviews
 

1947 births
Living people
Musicians from Auckland
New Zealand jazz pianists
New Zealand music arrangers
Grammy Award winners
Berklee College of Music alumni
Members of the New Zealand Order of Merit
New Zealand expatriates in the United States
20th-century New Zealand musicians
21st-century pianists